Brother (translit. Brat) is a 1997 Russian neo-noir crime drama film written and directed by Aleksei Balabanov. The film stars Sergei Bodrov Jr. as Danila Bagrov, a young ex-conscript who becomes embroiled with the Saint Petersburg mob through his criminal older brother. It appeared in the Un Certain Regard section at the 1997 Cannes Film Festival. 

After its release on VHS in June 1997, Brother unexpectedly became one of the most commercially successful Russian films of the 1990s and quickly rose to cult film status throughout Russia. Due to the film's popularity and fan demand, a sequel, Brother 2, was released in 2000.

Plot

After Danila Bagrov (Sergei Bodrov Jr.), a recently discharged Chechen War veteran, gets into a fight with security guards, his mother insists he travels to Saint Petersburg to seek out his successful older brother Viktor, whom his mother is confident will help him make a living. He does, and there he befriends Kat, an energetic drug addict, and "The German" Hoffman, a homeless street vendor whom Danila helps after a thug attempts to extort him.

Unbeknown to their mother, Viktor is an accomplished hitman who goes by the street name "The Tatar" but is growing too independent and is starting to irritate his mob boss, Roundhead. His latest target is "The Chechen", a Chechen mafia boss who was recently released from prison and now runs a market. Roundhead, who is unhappy with the amount of money that Viktor demanded for the hit, orders his thugs to watch him in secret.

Danila eventually meets up with Viktor. To avoid exposure, Viktor passes his assignment to his brother, gives him money to settle into the city, and then lies to him that the Chechen has been extorting from him, asking Danila to perform the hit, which he does. Roundhead's thugs spot and chase him, but he manages to escape by jumping into a freight tram, driven by a woman named Sveta.

After Danila recovers, he decides to meet up with her, despite her being married to an abusive husband. With the money given to him by Viktor after the hit, he begins to enjoy Saint Petersburg, gives his provincial image a makeover and takes Sveta out to a concert of his favorite band Nautilus Pompilius. At the same time he also meets up with Kat to go to a nightclub, smokes cannabis in an afterparty and sleeps with her afterwards.

Meanwhile, Roundhead is angry about losing one of his men and the fact that Viktor used someone else to carry out the hit, and decides to draw him into a combined raid. Viktor, again suspecting a trap, passes the job to Danila once more. The two thugs raid the apartment, but their main target is away. While they wait, in an apartment on the floor above, a party is taking place. A young radio director, Stepan, mistakes the raided flat for the party flat and is almost killed by the thugs, who take him captive. Bored of the waiting, Danila decides to go to the party above and relaxes in the friendly musical atmosphere. Some time afterward, he comes back to find the thugs killed their primary target, and are about to do the same with Stepan, but Danila kills them and, with Stepan's help, drags the bodies to the Smolensky Lutheran Cemetery, where Hoffman helps dispose of them.

Roundhead, furious finding out what happened, decides to track Danila and intercepts Sveta's tram. They later raid her apartment, where his men beat and rape her, and learn his phone number, as well as his address. A henchman nicknamed "Mole" ambushes Danila near his apartment building, but Danila manages to kill him. Realizing that staying home is unsafe, he travels to Sveta's house and is shocked at her state. He learns that Roundhead was responsible and realizes that the only way they could have tracked her was when he returned a phone call from her home telephone to his brother.

At the same time, Roundhead raids Viktor's apartment and forces him to call Danila at gunpoint, urging him to come over. Realizing the depth of the situation, Danila goes back to the communal room that he was renting, and buys a shotgun from his landlord. At Viktor's apartment, he takes out Roundhead and two of his henchmen and tells the surviving thug to warn the rest of the gang that he will kill anyone who hurts his brother.

Danila forgives Viktor and gives him some of the money from Roundhead's suitcase, telling him to return home and to work for the militsiya. Before leaving for Moscow, he visits Sveta, and upon finding her husband beating her, he shoots him in his leg before leaving. He then says goodbye to Hoffman and Kat, before hitching a ride to Moscow on a passing truck.

Cast
 Sergei Bodrov Jr. – Danila Bagrov
 Viktor Sukhorukov – Viktor Bagrov (voiced by Aleksei Poluyan)
 Svetlana Pismichenko – Sveta
 Maria Zhukova – Kat
 Yury Kuznetsov – "The German" Hoffman
 Irina Rakshina – Zinka
 Sergei Murzin – Roundhead (voiced by Aleksandr Stroev)
 Andrey Fyodortsov – Stepan
 Igor Shibanov – Militiaman
Andrey Krasko – Owner of the raided apartment
Aleksei Poluyan – "Mole" the bandit
Igor Lifanov – One of Roundhead's bandits (voiced by Aleksandr Bashirov)
Tatiana Zakharova – Danila's and Viktor's mother (voiced by Nina Usatova)
Sergei Debizhev – Music video director (voiced by Valery Kukhareshin)
Konstantin Anisimov – Music video security guard (voiced by Viktor Bychkov)
Anatoly Gorin – Sveta's roommate (voiced by Viktor Bychkov)

The film also features brief appearances from several Russian rock musicians:
 Vyacheslav Butusov, as well as other members of Nautilus Pompilius
 Sergey Chigrakov
 Nastya Poleva
 Band members of Aquarium
 Band members of Kolibri

Production crew
 Aleksei Balabanov – director, screenwriter
 Sergei Astakhov – camera operator
 Vladimir Kartashov – production designer
 Nadezhda Vasilyeva – costumer
 Vyacheslav Butusov – composer
 Sergei Selyanov – producer

Release
Brother was selected for screening at a number of Russian and international film festivals, where it won many awards. The festivals include, among others:
Cannes Film Festival, Un Certain Regard
Chicago International Film Festival

Sozvezdie

Torino International Film Festival

Trieste International Film Festival
The film was released on VHS in June 1997 and premiered on television on 12 December 1997.

Reception
The film became an instant hit, and raised the fortunes of both Sergey Bodrov and director Aleksei Balabanov. The story's depiction revolves around the problems and attitudes of the 1990s Russia: crime, poverty (in face of the homeless Hoffman), the disaffection of the Russian youth (as with the character Kat), failing families (as with Sveta and her abusive husband) and of course, betrayal and hypocrisy even towards the most closest of relatives (such as Viktor first using Danila as cover, and then turning him over). All this was brought about in the aftermath of the Soviet collapse, which took place only six years prior. Yet, despite such negative connotation amid the social decay, it illustrates that there is still courage and good in the face of Danila, who is portrayed as having an acute sense of right and wrong, and appears to follow some semblance of a moral code. As such it carries a powerful psychological message to the Russian audience that even in such gloomy times there is still hope.

Critical response
Brother has an approval rating of 100% on review aggregator website Rotten Tomatoes, based on 5 reviews, and an average rating of 7.63/10.

Sequel 
Following the film's success, Balabanov initially planned on making a Brother trilogy: the second instalment was to take place in Moscow and the third in America. During the writing phase, however, he abandoned this idea and combined the second and third parts into a single sequel instead. Brother 2 is notable for having a significantly higher budget, placing more emphasis on action sequences, and being set in Moscow and Chicago.

Music

Track listing

Legacy 
In the 2018 music video for her song "90", the Russian singer-songwriter Monetochka reenacts scenes from Brother.

Literature

References

External links

 Brother at Russian Film Hub

1997 films
1997 crime drama films
1990s crime action films
Russian crime drama films
1990s Russian-language films
Films about brothers
Films about the Russian Mafia
Films directed by Aleksei Balabanov
Films set in 1996
Films set in Saint Petersburg
Films shot in Saint Petersburg
Neo-noir